The 1989–90 season was Stoke City's 83rd season in the Football League and 30th in the Second Division.

The pressure was now on Mick Mills after four seasons without a serious promotion challenge and he spent big in the summer with £1 million worth of talent arriving at the Victoria Ground. However Stoke's overall performances left a lot to be desired and after failing to gain a victory until their 12th match Stoke hit the bottom of the table. With no improvement Mills paid the price and was sacked in November with former World Cup winner Alan Ball taking charge. Ball was unable to stop the slide into the third tier for only the second time in the club's history.

Season review

League
After four seasons of mid-table finishes manager Mick Mills spent big to turn Stoke into a side capable of gaining promotion to the First Division. He spent good money, breaking the club's record transfer of £480,000 for Sheffield Wednesday defender Ian Cranson, £75,000 on Derek Statham from West Bromwich Albion, £175,000 for Ian Scott and £250,000 for Wayne Biggins both from Manchester City. All four started the first match of the season in a 1–1 draw at home to West Ham United in front of an expectant crowd of 16,058. The teams's overall displays, however, left a lot to be desired and favourable results proved elusive, Stoke failing to win any of their first 11 matches.

Injuries, refereeing decisions and a spate of draws saw Stoke hit bottom spot in November after collecting just two wins in 19. With the club heading towards the third tier for the first time since 1927 Mills paid the price for his failure and was dismissed. Into Mills' place came Alan Ball, a former World Cup winner with England, whose previous job was with Portsmouth. Ball was appointed as Mills' assistant two months earlier. He made an instant impact as Stoke beat Newcastle United on Boxing Day. But injury to Ian Cranson against Bournemouth in March put a dent in any hopes of a revival. Ball chose to wheel and deal in the transfer market in an effort to halt the club's slide. He had come to the conclusion that the squad he had inherited was simply not good enough and out went Chris Kamara, Dave Bamber, Leigh Palin, Carl Saunders, Gary Hackett and Nicky Morgan. Into the side came Tony Ellis, Lee Sandford, Tony Kelly, Dave Kevan, Paul Barnes and Noel Blake.

It was a big gamble by Ball to change the squad around so much so quickly and it did not pay off, Stoke staying rooted to the bottom of the table and they subsequently fell through the trap door into the Third Division for the first time since 1927. Stoke won only six of their 46 matches and scored just 35 goals, Biggins getting 10. With Stoke's fate already sealed over 3,000 fans travelled to Brighton & Hove Albion for the final away match to have a 'relegation party'. There were few bright spots during a dismal season which saw the Potteries derby make a return, 27,032 saw Stoke and Vale draw 1–1 on 23 September and at Vale Park 22,075 saw a dull 0–0 on 3 February.

FA Cup
Former fan favourites Steve Bould and Lee Dixon returned to the Victoria Ground with Arsenal and a crowd of 23,827 saw David O'Leary score the only goal of the tie.

League Cup
After beating First Division Millwall 1–0 in the first leg Stoke lost the second leg 2–0 with some controversial referring decisions going against Stoke which led to Mick Mills having to be restrained on the touchline.

Full Members' Cup
Stoke entered the Full Members' Cup for the final time and went out in the second round losing on penalties to Leeds United.

Final league table

Results

Legend

Football League Second Division

FA Cup

League Cup

Full Members' Cup

Friendlies

Squad statistics

References

Stoke City F.C. seasons
Stoke